The 2018 season was the Sriwijaya's 12th season in the club's football history. Along with Liga 1, the club will compete in Piala Indonesia. In the pre-season, Sriwijaya attended two competitions, 2018 Indonesia President's Cup and 2018 East Kalimantan Governor's Cup with resulted in third place and champion respectively.

Month by month review

November 2017 
The team has announced former T-Team coach, Rahmad Darmawan as their new head coach. He is also Sriwijaya's former coach from 2007 season to 2009 season. Several players from previous season left the club as their contract terms came to their end and the club didn't renew their contracts. Esteban Vizcarra, Makan Konaté, Adam Alis, Alfin Tuasalamony, and Yogi Rahardian joined the club not long after the appointment of the new coach.

December 2017 
The club started their training for 2018 season on 4 December 2017 without their head coach due to his pilgrimage to Mecca. As of 8 December 2017, 13 new players had been signed for Sriwijaya, including 2017 AFC Cup best player and former FC Istiklol player, Manuchekhr Dzhalilov. However, two Semen Padang players, Irsyad Maulana and Agung Prasetyo cancelled from signing to Sriwijaya due to them accepted their previous club's new contract. Alberto Gonçalves and Esteban Vizcarra applied for Indonesian citizenship and expected to be completed before the new season league. The club held two friendly matches with local clubs with good results.

January 2018 
Several new players signed for Sriwijaya in January 2018, including ex-Borneo FC, Patrich Wanggai. The club also held one more friendly match with local club before heading to Java to hold two more friendly matches in Cilegon and Bekasi. Then, the team went to Bandung to compete in 2018 Indonesia President's Cup Group A with Persib Bandung, PSMS Medan, and PSM Makassar, booked their place in quarterfinal as the group leader with two wins and one loss.

February 2018 
Sriwijaya went into President's cup quarterfinal against Arema FC in Manahan Stadium, Surakarta and won against them with 3–1 score. The team failed to proceed to the final after they lost against Bali United by 0-1 aggregate. Sriwijaya won the third place of the cup after they defeated PSMS Medan with 4–0 score.

The team went to Balikpapan to attend 2018 East Kalimantan Governor's Cup in Group B with Persiba Balikpapan, Madura United, and Persebaya Surabaya. After having a win streaks against Persiba and Madura United, the team played their second team and lose against Persebaya 0-2 and booked the second place in the group and faced Borneo FC in Samarinda.

March 2018 
On 2 March, Sriwijaya won against Borneo 5–4 in penalty shootout. In this match, Sriwijaya's wingback Marckho Meraudje was punched by two match officials on the corridor leading to the dressing room after being sent off by referee after a red card for his foul against Borneo player Abdur Rahman, sparking outrage from his club.

On 4 March, Sriwijaya won 2018 East Kalimantan Governor's Cup after defeating Arema 3–2. Four days later, the throphy was brought to a parade in Palembang as the team came back from Kalimantan.

On 25 March, Sriwijaya's first match was ended in an away draw against Borneo 0–0 in Samarinda. Under fears of the cup incident, the team played stagnantly in the first half of the match with little improvisation and predictable attack plans. The team situation improved in the second half with aggressive approaches and increased pace as the team spent less time in holding the ball and attacking more aggressively, but they can't score any goals.

April 2018 
On 1 April 2018, Sriwijaya earned their first home victory against Persib Bandung 3–1. The first half marked by a sluggish start by Sriwijaya as the home stunned by Ezechiel N’Douassel in a counterattack, making Persib leads 1–0 against Sriwijaya. Two minutes on the second half, a long shot by Ezteban Viscarra equalised the score, then Sriwijaya leads the game 2-1 as Marckho Meraudje launched a strike to the upper left corner of the goal. Dzhalilov earned his first goal in the league as he ran onto Vizcarra's slide-rule pass before lifting his shot over Wirawan.

Coaching staff 

Source:

Squad information

First-team squad

New contracts

Promotion from Sriwijaya U-19

In

Out

Pre-season

Competitions

Overview

Liga 1

League table

Results summary

Results by matchday

Matches 

First round

Second round

Piala Indonesia

Matches

First round

Second round

Third round

In 2019 season

Squad statistics

Squad & Appearances

Goalscorers

References 

Sriwijaya F.C.
Sriwijaya F.C.